The Versace Experience: Prelude 2 Gold is a promotional mixtape by American musician Prince, originally issued as a limited edition cassette and given away to attendees of the Versace collection at the 1995 Paris Fashion Week. The album was intended to promote Prince's then-upcoming album The Gold Experience.

The cassette was re-released posthumously for Record Store Day on April 13, 2019, and released on CD, vinyl, as a digital download and for streaming through NPG Records and Legacy Recordings on September 13, 2019.

Music
The cassette was issued in promotion of Prince's 1995 album The Gold Experience and half of the included tracks are excerpts or mixes of songs which were later released on that album: "Pussy Control", "Shhh", "Eye Hate U", "319", "Shy", "Billy Jack Bitch" and "Gold". However, several were originally written for The New Power Generation's second album Exodus(1995), as well as his collaborations with Clare Fischer (issued as "the New Power Generation Orchestra"), and his jazz fusion group Madhouse.

Track listing
 "Pussy Control" (Club Mix) (edit)
 "Shhh" (X-cerpt)
 "Get Wild in the House" (performed by The New Power Generation)
 "Eye Hate U" (Remix)
 "319" (X-cerpt)
 "Shy" (X-cerpt)
 "Billy Jack Bitch"
 "Sonny T." (X-cerpt) (performed by Prince and Madhouse)
 "Rootie Kazootie" (performed by Prince and Madhouse)
 "Chatounette Controle"
 "Pussy Control (Control Tempo)" (edit)
 "Kamasutra Overture #5" (performed by The New Power Generation Orchestra)
 "Free the Music" (performed by The New Power Generation)
 "Segue"
 "Gold" (X-cerpt)

Charts

References

External links
 Prince’s Versace Experience, With Rare Songs From Paris Fashion Week 1995, Is Now Streaming: Listen

1995 albums
2019 albums
Albums produced by Prince (musician)
Albums published posthumously
NPG Records albums
Prince (musician) albums